Mons Monssen (January 20, 1857–February 10, 1930) was a sailor in the United States Navy who received the Medal of Honor for heroism while serving about the .

Biography
Mons Monssen was born January 20, 1857, on a farm in Tolleshaug, Norway and enlisted in the United States Navy on June 3, 1889.

Eighteen officers and men lost their lives. Monssen entered the burning magazine through the scuttle and threw water on the fire with his hands until a hose was passed to him. For his actions he received the Medal of Honor a month later.

Monssen was warranted as a gunner on May 27, 1904, and promoted to chief gunner on May 27, 1910.

He was commissioned lieutenant in July 1918 and he retired December 15, 1925.

He died at the Naval Hospital, Brooklyn, New York, February 10, 1930 and is buried at Cypress Hills National Cemetery.

Medal of Honor citation
Rank and organization. Chief Gunner's Mate, U.S. Navy. Born: January 20, 1867, Norway. G.O. No.: 160, May 26, 1904.

Citation:

Serving on board the U.S.S. Missouri, for extraordinary heroism in entering a burning magazine through the scuttle and endeavoring to extinguish the fire by throwing water with his hands until a hose was passed to him, 13 April 1904.

Namesake
See  for the two ships named in his honor.

See also

List of Medal of Honor recipients during Peacetime

References

1867 births
1930 deaths
United States Navy Medal of Honor recipients
United States Navy officers
Norwegian-born Medal of Honor recipients
Burials at Cypress Hills National Cemetery
Norwegian emigrants to the United States
Non-combat recipients of the Medal of Honor